Alabang station is a railway station located on the South Main Line in Muntinlupa, Metro Manila, Philippines.

Description
The station is the sixteenth station southbound from Tutuban and is one of three PNR stations serving Muntinlupa, the two others being Sucat and Muntinlupa. The station is located on T. Molina Street in Alabang, Muntinlupa, near the Alabang Viaduct of the South Luzon Expressway.

Alabang station is the only PNR station to be completely rebuilt in a different location, having been moved from its original location at Montillano Street to behind Starmall Alabang on T. Molina Street. The new station was opened on April 19, 2010. The other one is Dela Rosa station which moved a block south to better accommodate longest trains and mitigate traffic congestion at the grade crossing along Gil Puyat Avenue.

Nearby landmarks
The station is directly connected to Starmall Alabang. It is also near several health institutions such as the Asian Hospital and Medical Center, the Research Institute for Tropical Medicine, and the Ospital ng Muntinlupa; educational institutions such as the Saint Bernadette College of Alabang, Saint Francis of Assisi College Alabang, Alabang Elementary School, West Bay College, San Roque Catholic School - Annex, and Pedro E. Diaz High School; other shopping centers like Lianas Supermarket and Department Store, Festival Alabang, and Ayala Malls South Park; and corporate offices within Filinvest Corporate City such as the headquarters of Insular Life. Further away from the station are the headquarters of the Food and Drug Administration (formerly the Bureau of Food and Drugs), San Beda College Alabang, the Alabang Town Center, Madrigal Business Park, and Ayala Alabang Village.

Transportation links
The station is accessible by jeepneys plying the South Luzon Expressway, Alabang-Zapote Road, and Manila South Road (National Highway) routes. A terminal for buses and jeepneys could be found at Starmall Alabang, while the South Station jeepney terminal is located across the mall on the other side of the South Luzon Expressway.

Station layout

External links

Philippine National Railways stations
Railway stations in Metro Manila
Railway stations opened in 2010
Buildings and structures in Muntinlupa